Atrosalarias hosokawai is a species of combtooth blenny found in coral reefs in the western Pacific Ocean, from Japan to Papua New Guinea. It can reach a maximum length of  SL.

References

hosokawai
Fish described in 1999